Orsa Grönklitt is a wildlife park noted for its bears, and ski resort,  from Stockholm in the municipality of Orsa. During the winter months it is a major ski resort and hosts numerous competitions including a skiing marathon. The Orsa Grönklitt Ski Centre offers 22 runs.
Orsa Grönklitt is the only zoo in Europe housing Kodiak bears.

References

External links
 

Ski areas and resorts in Sweden
Ski marathons
Buildings and structures in Dalarna County
Tourist attractions in Dalarna County